Rebel is a 2015 Indian Kannada-language action drama film directed by Rajendra Singh Babu and starring Aditya, Preetika Rao, Sanjjanaa, and Suhasini Maniratnam.

Cast 
Aditya as Karthik
Preetika Rao
Sanjjanaa
Suhasini Maniratnam as Anupama
Shawar Ali as Shawar Ali
Sharath Lohitashwa as Rana
Sadhu Kokila
Ramakrishna
Sudharani

Production 
The film began production in 2011, but the film was delayed and news of the film later resurfaced. Aditya plays an NSG commando and trained with real commandoes to prepare for the film. This was the second collaboration between Rajendra Singh Babu and Aditya after Love (2004).

Reception 
A critic from Bangalore Mirror wrote that "It is not only the narration that is patchy, even the technical standards are like a B Grade film. There are many scenes that seem to have been shot on a cheap mobile phone and are pixelated on the big screen". A critic from The Times of India wrote that "The plot, if we are to call it that, is like a jigsaw puzzle made of dough. Malleable, it twists and turns according to the whims of the makers, in order to accommodate every little character in every other frame". A critic from The Hindu wrote that "There are some films that are so bad that they are fun to watch. And then there is a film like S.V. Rajendra Singh Babu’s Rebel which does not fall even into that category".

References